The Switzerland women's national volleyball team is the national team of Switzerland. It takes part in international volleyball competitions.

Results

European Championship
 Champions   Runners-up   Third place   Fourth place

European Volleyball League
 Champions   Runners-up   Third place   Fourth place

Team

Current squad
The following is the Switzerland roster in the 2013 Women's European Volleyball Championship

Head coach: Svetlana Ilić

See also
Switzerland men's national volleyball team

References

External links

FIVB profile
CEV profile

National women's volleyball teams
Volleyball
Women's volleyball in Switzerland